The whiptail conger (Rhynchoconger gracilior), also known as the conger eel in Cuba, is an eel in the family Congridae (conger/garden eels). It was described by Isaac Ginsburg in 1951, originally under the genus Congrina. It is a marine, deep water-dwelling eel which is known from the western Atlantic Ocean, including the United States in the northern Gulf of Mexico and northern South America.

References

Congridae
Fish described in 1951